Akkaraipattu Municipal Council (AMC) is the local authority for Akkaraipattu in south-eastern Sri Lanka. AMC is responsible for providing a variety of local public services including roads, sanitation, drains, housing, libraries, public parks and recreational facilities. It has nine members elected using the open list proportional representation system.

History
Akkaraipattu Municipal Council was created with effect from 1 April 2011 from parts of Akkaraipattu Rural Council (Akkaraipattu Pradesha Sabhai or Akkaraipattu Pradeshiya Sabha). The Campaign for Free and Fair Elections (CaFFE), an independent election monitoring organisation, criticised the hasty creation of AMC, stating that Local Government Minister A. L. M. Athaullah had not followed proper procedures. CaFFE pointed out that a Rural Council is usually promoted to Urban Council before being promoted to a Municipal Council whereas AMC had received a "double=promotion". The creation of AMC had left Akkaraipattu Rural Council with just five election centres and only 4,000 electors. CaFFE also stated that the promotion of Trincomalee Urban Council and Ampara Urban Council to Municipal Council had long been discussed but ignored by Athaullah. Akkaraipattu is Athaullah's local electorate and according to CaFFE Athaullah was "trying to gain political mileage from the elevation".

Election results

2011 local government election
Results of the local government election held on 17 March 2011:

The following candidates were elected: Abdul Gaffoor Asmy; Ahamed Zackie Athaullah (NC); Sinna Lebbe Mohamed Haniffa; Noor Mohamed Najimudeen; Mohamed Mohideen Mohamed Nilam; Mohamed Mohideen Mohamed Rizam (NC); Sainulabdeen Mohamed Safees; Aatham Lebbe Thavam; and Kalanthar Lebbe Mohamed Zarook.

Ahamed Zackie Athaullah (NC) and Mohamed Mohideen Mohamed Rizam (NC) were appointed Mayor and Deputy Mayor respectively. Ahamed Zackie Athaullah (NC) is the son of Local Government Minister A. L. M. Athaullah.

References

Government of Ampara District
Local authorities in Eastern Province, Sri Lanka
Municipal councils of Sri Lanka